Chahu Genow-e Pain (also Romanized as Chāhū Genow-e Pā'īn; also known as Poshteh-ye Mowlā) is a village in Tazian Rural District, in the Central District of Bandar Abbas County, Hormozgan Province, Iran. At the 2006 census, its population was 93, in 20 families.

References 

Populated places in Bandar Abbas County